The Knight of Freedom Award is a Polish international award conferred annually to "outstanding figures, who promote the values represented by General Casimir Pulaski: freedom, justice, and democracy".

History
The award was established in 2005 and is presented by the Casimir Pulaski Foundation, which is an independent, non-profit think tank specializing in foreign policy and international security. The award committee chaired by Zbigniew Pisarski, the President of the Casimir Pulaski Foundation, presents the laureates with handmade replicas of the sabre (Polish: karabela) used by General Pulaski. The award ceremony takes place each year during the Warsaw Security Forum and the award is considered to be one of the most important Polish foreign policy and human rights awards.

Laureates

See also 
Solidarity Prize
Sakharov Prize

References 

Polish awards
Awards established in 2005
2005 establishments in Poland
Free expression awards
European human rights awards